Varalaxmi Sarathkumar (born 5 March 1985) is an Indian actress who appears in Tamil and Telugu films, in addition to Kannada and Malayalam films. She made her debut with the Tamil film Podaa Podi (2012).

Early life and family
Varalaxmi was born to actor Sarathkumar and Chaya on 5 March 1985. Her stepmother is actress Raadhika.

Varalaxmi did her schooling at St. Michael's Academy, Chennai. She is a graduate in Microbiology from Hindustan Arts and Science college, Chennai with a Masters in Business Management from the University of Edinburgh. She honed her acting skills at Anupam Kher's Acting School in Mumbai, before becoming a professional actress.

Career
Varalaxmi auditioned for Shankar's Boys (2003) and was selected to play the lead role, before her father requested her to turn down the opportunity. Likewise, she also missed out on opportunities to act in Balaji Sakthivel's Kaadhal (2004) and Venkat Prabhu's Saroja (2008).

Varalaxmi signed on to star in Vignesh Shivan's romantic drama film Podaa Podi (2012) during June 2008, citing that the opportunity to portray a London-based dancer had excited her. The film went through a protracted development, taking four years to make, before being released in October 2012. Co-starring Silambarasan, Varalaxmi won critical acclaim for her performance. Rediff.com noted she was the "scene stealer" and added "she comes across as a genuine, warm person, able and willing to accept those around her for themselves, and rattles off her dialogues with such spontaneity and charm that she wins you over right away". Likewise, a critic from Sify.com wrote she "is the big surprise here as she makes a promising debut and brings alive her character with not just those smart lines, but with the kind of confidence and candour". The film also performed moderately at the box office, and performed particularly well in the multiplexes. Soon after the film's release, Varalaxmi worked on Sundar C's masala film Madha Gaja Raja, alongside Vishal, but the film remains unreleased owing to financial troubles.

Her second release was the Kannada film Maanikya (2014), alongside actor Sudeep, and the film went on to become amongst the most profitable Kannada films of the year. In 2014, she began filming for Bala's Tharai Thappattai (2016), where she had to lose ten kilograms to portray a karakattam dancer.

In 2016, she announced on Twitter that she has been cast alongside Mammootty in the Malayalam film Kasaba. In her tweet, the actress said that the big opportunity to work alongside Mammootty came to her apparently due to her performance in the Tamil film Tharai Thappattai. Varalaxmi was also committed to starring in Aakasha Mittaayee, the Malayalam remake of the Tamil film Appa but left, citing the behaviour of its producers who she called "mannerless". In 2017, Varalaxmi appears successively with, Vikram Vedha, Nibunan, Vismaya, Sathya, Kaattu  and Masterpiece. Varalaxmi turned as Host for a TV show titled Unnai Arindhaal (2018) which will be aired on every Sunday in Jaya TV. She played antagonist role in Sandakozhi 2 (2018) and Sarkar (2018). She worked on her first Telugu film, Tenali Ramakrishna BA. BL (2019). She has played an investigative thriller Danny (2020) in which Varalaxmi Sarathkumar tries out the role of a cop. The makers have chosen to bestow the title Makkal Selvi on Varalaxmi in the title credits and all the promotional materials of the film.

Filmography

Film

Television

Awards and nominations

References

External links 
 
 

Actresses in Tamil cinema
Living people
1985 births
21st-century Indian actresses
Tamil actresses
Actresses in Kannada cinema
Actresses from Bangalore
Indian film actresses
Actresses in Malayalam cinema
Female models from Chennai
Indian Tamil people
Alumni of the University of Edinburgh
Actresses in Telugu cinema
Actresses in Telugu television